"L'Amour et moi" is Jenifer Bartoli's second single from her fifth album L'Amour et moi on which it is the fifth track. It was released on September 29, 2012 in Francophone countries and achieved success in France and Belgium (Wallonia).

Charts

References

Jenifer (singer) songs
2012 singles
2012 songs
Mercury Records singles